Dane Lussier (December 23, 1909 – October 10, 1959) was an American screenwriter. He was the father of songwriter Deke Richards.

Selected filmography
 Ladies' Day (1943)
 Storm Over Lisbon (1944)
 A Sporting Chance (1945)
 The Falcon's Alibi (1946)
 Dick Tracy vs. Cueball (1946)
 Smooth as Silk (1946)
 The Pilgrim Lady (1947)
 My Dream Is Yours (1949)
 Family Honeymoon (1949)
 It Happens Every Thursday (1953)

References

Bibliography
  Martin, Len D. The Republic Pictures Checklist: Features, Serials, Cartoons, Short Subjects and Training Films of Republic Pictures Corporation, 1935-1959. McFarland, 1998.

External links

1909 births
1959 deaths
Writers from Spokane, Washington
Screenwriters from Washington (state)
20th-century American screenwriters